Play! Pokémon, formerly known as Pokémon Organized Play (often abbreviated as POP), is a division of The Pokémon Company International established in 2003 and known for hosting the Pokémon World Championships, a competitive eSports tournament which features the Pokémon Trading Card Game (TCG), Pokemon Go, the Pokémon Video Game Championships (VGC), and the Pokkén Tournament Championships. It is the official governing body of the competitive tournament circuit for Pokémon, as well as the organizer of a variety of programs for casual players of the game.

History 
Play! Pokémon was formed in 2003 under the supervision of The Pokémon Company International (previously known as Pokémon USA) after Wizards of the Coast lost its license to the Trading Card Game. Since then, a new league, tournament, and prize system was created.

Organizational structure
The organizational structure of Play! Pokémon is such that with the exception of major tournaments (i.e. International and World Championships), which are mostly run by The Pokémon Company International and its affiliates, all other tournaments (of a smaller scale) are run by volunteers which are part of a Play! Pokémon program known as the 'Professor Program'.

These volunteers, which are known as Pokémon Professors, are sanctioned by the Play! Pokémon program to help promote the game in many ways such as by judging, advertising and staffing events whilst upholding the spirit of the game. These Pokémon Professors can also host and run tournaments for their local community.

Non-competitive programs 
Play! Pokémon organizes a variety of programs intended to be a starting point for beginner players of the Trading Card Game and/or the Video Games. These programs are casual in nature and tend to be organized by Pokémon Professor volunteers and held in public locations such as game stores, community centers, or libraries.

 Play! Pokémon Leagues:  Leagues are run by volunteers with an approved background check conducted by Play! Pokémon. A league cycle is usually divided into eight seasons, each of which lasts about five weeks and is typically represented by themes found in Pokémon (e.g. gym badges, starter Pokémon). Players can earn prizes like physical Gym badges or seasonal promotional cards by completing rows in their player score card assigned to them at the event. There may be several weeks of a break in-between seasons, but most leagues continue to play to allow players to catch up on prizes they may have missed. League sessions typically last for two to four hours, and players usually meet once every week.
 Local Tournaments: Local tournaments may be held by an organizer sanctioned by Play! Pokémon. Prizes and entry fees vary depending on the number of competitors, and the tournaments can either be free to enter or require an entry fee at the discretion of the organizer. The tournaments are typically single-elimination, Swiss-system, or a combination of both (i.e. Swiss followed by single elimination rounds). Sometimes, the tournaments apply an "Age Modified Swiss" system, a variation of Swiss in which a player's age takes priority over the player's record when the players are paired. Players may also be categorized by age if there is a significant number of players. Categories range from Junior (ages 12 and under), Senior (ages 13–15) and Master (ages 16 and over). When the tournament is complete, players are given a rating based on their performance following the Elo rating system.
 Prerelease Tournaments: Prerelease Tournaments are Trading Card Game events in which players play with cards from an expansion set that would not have been released until up to two weeks later. The typical entry fee is $20–35 and each player would be given six booster packs, a special promo card, and a set of sleeves that are themed after the new set. Each player builds a 40-card deck using the cards opened out of the six packs (not including basic Energy cards, which are provided at the event). At the end of each prerelease, players receive three extra booster packs. Players may also have the option of playing in a 'Theme Deck challenge' instead of the Prerelease event, where they play for a themed deck and 4 booster packs.

Pokémon Championship Series 
Tournaments part of the Pokémon Championship Series (i.e. Premier Tournaments) are competitive tournaments which reward players with Championship Points based on their finishing position at the tournament. Players earn an invitation to compete in the annual Pokémon World Championships should they accumulate enough points above a pre-determined threshold at the end of the season. The threshold depends on the type of game played, the player's age division and the region in which the player is registered in, and may change at the start of each season.

Premier Tournaments vary in size, scale and frequency, and can be classified into any one of the event types as shown in the following table. Entry-level and mid-level events tend to be run independently by sanctioned tournament organizers and are run all year round, while events of a larger scale tend to be few and far between, but have better prize support and larger Championship Point payouts. The scale of an event may be estimated by the maximum number of Championship Points a player can obtain from winning the tournament.

List of participating countries
The Play! Pokémon program is administered across different countries by classifying them into four 'rating zones' based on their geographical location (i.e. North America, Europe, Latin America and Oceania). On June 10, 2020, it was announced that Asia would no longer be part of the Play! Pokémon program and will have its own qualifying system towards the Pokémon World Championships.

As of June 2, 2020, the list of countries in each rating zone are as follows.

External links

References 

Pokémon